Jürgen Serr (born 21 May 1965) is a retired German football midfielder.

References

1965 births
Living people
Sportspeople from Hamm
German footballers
VfR Mannheim players
Rot-Weiss Essen players
SC Preußen Münster players
2. Bundesliga players
Association football midfielders
Footballers from North Rhine-Westphalia